Shanghai Natural History Museum is a station on the Shanghai Metro, which services Line 13 and opened on December 19, 2015. The station is located near the Shanghai Natural History Museum.

References

Railway stations in Shanghai
Line 13, Shanghai Metro
Shanghai Metro stations in Jing'an District
Railway stations in China opened in 2015